The canton of Quercy-Aveyron is an administrative division of the Tarn-et-Garonne department, in southern France. It was created at the French canton reorganisation which came into effect in March 2015. Its seat is in Albias.

It consists of the following communes:

Albias 
Auty
Cayrac
L'Honor-de-Cos
Lamothe-Capdeville
Mirabel
Molières
Montalzat
Montastruc
Montfermier
Montpezat-de-Quercy
Piquecos
Réalville
Saint-Vincent-d'Autéjac
Villemade

References

Cantons of Tarn-et-Garonne